Marcellus Gomes (born 16 January 1961) is an Indian field hockey player. He competed at the 1984 Summer Olympics in Los Angeles, where the Indian team placed fifth.

References

External links

1961 births
Living people
Field hockey players from Goa
Olympic field hockey players of India
Field hockey players at the 1984 Summer Olympics
Indian male field hockey players
Asian Games medalists in field hockey
Field hockey players at the 1982 Asian Games
Asian Games silver medalists for India
Medalists at the 1982 Asian Games